Bavarkan (also Romanized as Bavārkān; also known as Barāvkān, Bīravakūn, and Pīr Afghān) is a village in Khvajehei Rural District, Meymand District, Firuzabad County, Fars Province, Iran. At the 2006 census, its population was 696, in 165 families.

References 

Populated places in Firuzabad County